The 2020 Philippine Basketball Association (PBA) Philippine Cup Finals was the best-of-7 championship series of the 2020 PBA Philippine Cup, the lone conference of the season. The Barangay Ginebra San Miguel and the TNT Tropang Giga competed for the 42nd Philippine Cup championship and the 128th overall championship contested by the league. For the first time in six seasons and after winning the previous five titles, the San Miguel Beermen was not able to defend their Philippine Cup title after being eliminated by the Meralco Bolts in the quarterfinals.

This was the first time that the two teams met in the Philippine Cup finals since the 2004–05 season when Barangay Ginebra won the championship against Talk 'N Text, four games to two.

Barangay Ginebra defeated TNT, four games to one, to win the franchise's fourth Philippine Cup (13 years after their last Philippine Cup championship in 2007) and their 13th title overall. LA Tenorio was named the Finals' MVP.

Background

Barangay Ginebra San Miguel
Before the season started, Ginebra suffered a major blow when Greg Slaughter decided to take a break from basketball, following the expiration of his contract. Ginebra added Arvin Tolentino, Jerrick Balanza, and Kent Salado to the roster after selecting them in the 2019 PBA draft.

Ginebra started the season with four straight wins. However, they suffered from two straight setbacks after losing to Magnolia and Rain or Shine. Ginebra would eventually go 4–1 over their final five games to finish the eliminations round with an 8–3 record. Their record was tied with Phoenix for the best in the league, but Ginebra took the first seed as they defeated Phoenix in the eliminations. They advanced to the quarterfinals, holding a twice-to-beat advantage.

In the quarterfinals, Ginebra faced off against Rain or Shine. They defeated them in one game, 81–73, to advance to the semifinals. In the best-of-5 semifinals, Ginebra faced off against Meralco. This marked the fifth time in the last five years that both teams met in the playoffs. The series went to the distance after the two teams alternated wins in the first four games. In the do-or-die game 5, both teams were tied at 80 with 14.5 seconds left. In the game's final possession, Scottie Thompson drilled the game winning triple with 0.6 seconds left to send Ginebra to the Philippine Cup finals.

TNT Tropang Giga
Before the season started, TNT, NLEX, and Blackwater completed a three-team trade that sent Poy Erram, a former Defensive Player of the Year, to TNT.

TNT started the season strong after pulling off five straight wins. However, TNT struggled over their last six games, going 2–4 to finish the eliminations round with a 7–4 record, tied for the second best in the league. TNT would eventually get the third seed after quotients were applied. As part of the top 4 seeded teams, TNT advanced to the quarterfinals with a twice-to-beat advantage.

In the quarterfinals, TNT faced off against Alaska. They would advance to the semifinals after defeating Alaska in one game, 104–83. In the semifinals, TNT faced Phoenix, who held the second seed. After winning the first game, TNT fell to the brink of elimination after losing two straight games. TNT would eventually bounce back, defeating Phoenix in the final two games to advance to the Philippine Cup finals.

Road to the finals

Head-to-head matchup

Series summary

Game summaries

Game 1

Ginebra won Game 1, 100–94, in overtime to take a 1–0 series lead. Japeth Aguilar led Ginebra with 25 points and 16 rebounds on an efficient 11–14 shooting while Stanley Pringle had 24 points, 7 rebounds, and 7 assists. Three other players scored in double digits for Ginebra. Bobby Ray Parks Jr. paced the scoring for TNT with 20 points before fouling out in overtime.

In the first quarter, TNT started off strong, leading by as much as 7 before taking a 5 point lead heading to the second quarter. Scoring slowed down in the second quarter, with Ginebra outscoring TNT, 19–14, to tie the game heading into halftime. Ginebra began to pull away in the third quarter as they led by as much as 9 with 6:55 left in the quarter. However, TNT went on a 20–6 run to end the quarter with a 5 point lead. Both teams went back-and-forth in the fourth quarter. In the final minutes of regulation, TNT hit three consecutive three pointers to take a 1 point lead with 36 seconds left. Ginebra had a chance to take the lead but Pringle lost the ball out of bounds. Parks was fouled on the ensuing possession, but he split his free throws. With 11 seconds to go, LA Tenorio drove to the basket before passing to a cutting Arvin Tolentino, who hit the game-tying layup with 5 seconds left. With a chance to win, Jayson Castro missed a floater before time expired.

In overtime, TNT struggled to find its offense, scoring only 2 points in overtime as Ginebra slowly pulled away. Ginebra effectively sealed the game when Tenorio found a wide open Aguilar for an uncontested dunk, giving them a 6 point lead with 19 seconds left.

Game 2

After trailing by as much as 15 in the third quarter, Ginebra came back to win Game 2, 92–90, to take a 2–0 lead in the series. Stanley Pringle led Ginebra with 34 points, 6 rebounds, and 8 assists while Aljon Mariano was an X-factor off the bench, scoring 20 points as the other role players for Ginebra struggled. For TNT, they were dealt a big blow before Game 2 when Bobby Ray Parks Jr., the team's leading scorer, was listed as doubtful to play after he suffered from a left calf strain in Game 1. In Parks' absence, Roger Pogoy waxed hot for TNT, scoring 38 points.

The game started off slow for both teams, with Ginebra taking a 4 point lead, 21–17, heading to the second quarter. Pringle provided most of the offense for Ginebra, scoring 12 points in that quarter alone. In the second quarter, Pogoy started to hit his shots while Ginebra continued to struggle from the field. The two teams headed to halftime with TNT holding a 4 point lead. TNT began to pull away in the third quarter, starting with a 14–3 run to erect their biggest lead of the game at 15. Pogoy did most of the damage as he scored 15 points in the quarter alone. However, Ginebra managed to claw their way back using a lineup that featured only one starter in Pringle. Pringle and Mariano combined for 24 points in the third to cut TNT's lead to 2 heading into the final quarter.

In the fourth quarter, both teams remained close, with TNT holding the lead for most of the quarter. With 4 minutes left, Pogoy hit a three pointer that gave TNT a 7 point lead. Ginebra answered with a 7–0 run that tied the game with 2 minutes left. After the two teams traded misses, with 53 seconds to go, Jayson Castro was fouled while he was going for the offensive rebound. Castro split his free throws to give TNT a 1 point lead. On the ensuing possession, Pringle found Scottie Thompson for a wide open three that went in, giving Ginebra a 2 point lead with 30 seconds to go. The three was Thompson's only points and field goal in the game. With a chance to tie or take the lead, Castro missed a three pointer but LA Tenorio split his free throws, still making it a one-possession game. With a chance to send the game to overtime, Pogoy missed his three pointer as Tenorio sealed the game at the foul line.

Game 3

TNT avoided an 0–3 hole after dominating Ginebra in Game 3, 88–67, cutting Ginebra's series lead to 2–1. For the second straight game, TNT missed the services of their leading scorer, Bobby Ray Parks Jr. However, TNT had a balanced scoring effort, with Roger Pogoy scoring a team-high 19 points. Four other players scored in double figures for TNT. LA Tenorio paced Ginebra with 19 points but the other players struggled. After scoring 34 in Game 2, Stanley Pringle was limited to 11 points.

In the first quarter, Ginebra raced off to an early 9 point lead but TNT was able to cut the lead to 5 at the end of the quarter. Tenorio started the game strong, scoring 12 points including 4 three pointers. TNT would start the second quarter with an 11–0 run to take the lead as Ginebra struggled to score. TNT outscored Ginebra, 23–8, in the quarter to take a 10 point lead into halftime. TNT would extend their lead to as much as 15 in the third quarter but much like in Game 2, Ginebra would stage a rally, cutting their deficit to 2. However, TNT ended the third quarter with a 10–2 run, extending their lead to 10 before the fourth quarter. TNT would not look back as they continued to extend their lead in the final quarter.

Game 4

Ginebra moved to within 1 win away from taking the Philippine Cup title after defeating TNT, 98–88, to take a commanding 3–1 lead. Japeth Aguilar and LA Tenorio led Ginebra with 22 points apiece while Stanley Pringle added 16 of his own. Scottie Thompson had a near triple-double with 11 points, 11 rebounds, and 9 assists. For TNT, Roger Pogoy paced their scoring once again with 34 points. Poy Erram and Troy Rosario added 19 and 16, respectively. They played their third straight game without Bobby Ray Parks Jr. Adding to their injury woes, Jayson Castro aggravated a left knee injury in the third quarter. He did not return for the rest of the game.

Both teams started slow in the first quarter, with Ginebra taking a 17–14 lead heading into the second quarter. The scored remained close in the second quarter before Ginebra went on an 8–0 run to go to halftime with a 10 point lead. Ginebra continued to outplay TNT in the third quarter, extending their lead to as much as 17 before heading into the final quarter with a 16 point lead. In the fourth quarter, Ginebra extended their lead further to 18 points before TNT staged a big rally. Pogoy waxed hot, scoring 16 of his 34 in the final quarter to lead TNT's rally. Back-to-back three pointers from Pogoy cut Ginebra's lead to just 3 with 2:50 left. Tenorio answered with a three pointer of his own before Pogoy hit his third consecutive three to make it a one-possession game once again. Tenorio would answer once again with another three to bring their lead back to 6 with 1:43 left. TNT would fail to score for the rest of the game as Ginebra sealed the win with a layup from Thompson and a mid-range jumper from Tenorio.

Game 5

Ginebra defeated TNT in Game 5, 82–78, to win the franchise's 4th Philippine Cup and their 13th title overall. The title was also Ginebra's second consecutive title after winning last year's Governors' Cup title. Japeth Aguilar led Ginebra in scoring with 32 points, tying his career-high. Stanley Pringle had 13 points, with 11 of those coming in the crucial fourth quarter after he struggled from the field in the first three quarters. LA Tenorio added 10 points and 6 assists and he was named Finals' MVP for the fourth time in his career. For TNT, Roger Pogoy once again top-scored with 23 points. Poy Erram, Simon Enciso, and Troy Rosario added 18, 17, and 12 points respectively. TNT struggled to find offense from their bench as they were limited to just 2 bench points. Jayson Castro and Bobby Ray Parks Jr. did not play due to their injuries.

In the first quarter, TNT came out with more energy as they held a 7 point lead early on. Ginebra would end the quarter with a 9–2 run to tie the game at 19 heading to the second quarter. After picking up two early fouls in the opening quarter, Aguilar scored 16 of Ginebra's 19 points in the second quarter. Ginebra led TNT, 38–36, going into halftime. TNT threatened to pull away in the third quarter, unleashing a 12–1 run to lead by 7. Pogoy scored 11 points in the quarter after struggling from the field in the first half. However, Ginebra slowly came back as the quarter ended with TNT taking a 1 point lead.

In the fourth quarter, Ginebra started with a 9–2 run to take a 6 point lead. Pringle, who was limited to 2 points on 1–10 shooting in the first three quarters, scored the first 5 points for Ginebra in the quarter. Later in the quarter, TNT countered with an 11–0 run of their own to take a 5 point lead with 5 minutes left in the game. However, Ginebra unleashed a 12–0 run to take a 7 point lead with less than a minute left. During the run, Pringle knocked down back-to-back three pointers that gave Ginebra a 76–73 lead with 3:18 left. TNT struggled to score during the finishing minutes of the game while Aguilar scored on an alley-oop dunk and Joe Devance scored on a layup to cap Ginebra's run. TNT cut the lead to 3 with 9 seconds left but Tenorio clinched the game and the title with two free-throws.

Rosters

{| class="toccolours" style="font-size: 95%; width: 100%;"
|-
! colspan="2" style="background-color: #; color: #; text-align: center;" | Barangay Ginebra San Miguel 2020 PBA Philippine Cup roster
|- style="background-color:#; color: #; text-align: center;"
! Players !! Coaches
|-
| valign="top" |
{| class="sortable" style="background:transparent; margin:0px; width:100%;"
! Pos. !! # !! POB !! Name !! Height !! Weight !! !! College 
|-

  Also serves as Barangay Ginebra's board governor.

{| class="toccolours" style="font-size: 95%; width: 100%;"
|-
! colspan="2" style="background-color: #; color: #; text-align: center;" | TNT Tropang Giga 2020 PBA Philippine Cup roster
|- style="background-color:#; color: #; text-align: center;"
! Players !! Coaches
|-
| valign="top" |
{| class="sortable" style="background:transparent; margin:0px; width:100%;"
! Pos. !! # !! POB !! Name !! Height !! Weight !! !! College 
|-

Broadcast notes

The Philippine Cup Finals was aired on TV5 with simulcasts on One Sports and PBA Rush (both in standard and high definition). TV5's radio arm, Radyo5 provided the radio play-by-play coverage.

One Sports provided online livestreaming via their official YouTube account and Facebook fan page using the TV5 feed.

The PBA Rush broadcast provided English-language coverage of the Finals.

Due to COVID-19 restrictions, the TV and radio panel are doing commentaries offsite from the TV5 Media Center in Mandaluyong.

Additional Game 5 crew: 
Trophy presentation: Carlo Pamintuan
Celebration interviewers: Selina Dagdag-Alas and Denise Tan

References

External links
PBA official website

2020
2020 PBA season
PBA Philippine Cup Finals
PBA Philippine Cup Finals